Bornheim (Ripuarian: Bonnem) is a town in the Rhein-Sieg district, in North Rhine-Westphalia, Germany. It is situated on the West bank of the Rhine, approx. 10 km north-west of Bonn, 20 km south of Cologne.

The town borders on Bonn to the south, the towns of Alfter and Swisttal to the southwest, the town of Weilerswist to the west, the towns of Brühl and Wesseling to the north, as well as the Rhine-bordering town of Niederkassel in the east.

Subdivisions

Bornheim is divided up into 14 districts: Bornheim, Brenig, Dersdorf, Hemmerich, Hersel, Kardorf, Merten, Rösberg, Roisdorf, Sechtem, Uedorf, Walberberg, Waldorf and Widdig.

Economy
Bornheim has a strong agricultural industry and is famous for its white asparagus.

Twin towns – sister cities

Bornheim is twinned with:
 Bornem, Belgium
 Mittweida, Germany
 Zawiercie, Poland

Notable people
Paul von Rusdorf (c. 1385–1441), the master of the Teutonic Order in 1422–1441, came from the knighthood of the lords of Roisdorf. He is buried in the Annenkapelle of the Marienburg
Ernst Volckheim (11 April 1898 – 1 September 1962) was one of the founders of armored and mechanized warfare
Günter Lamprecht (born 1930), actor, lives in Bornheim
Hans-Helmuth Knütter (born 1934), political scientist and author, lives in Bornheim
Anton Schumacher (born 1938), football goalkeeper, lives in Bornheim-Hemmerich
Franz Bosbach (born 1952), historian
Klaus Ludwig (born 1949), race car driver, lived in Bornheim-Roisdorf
Bernd Stelter (born 1961), carnival and television comedian, lives in Hersel
Johannes B. Kerner (born 1964), sportsmoderator, lived as a child in Hersel
Arnd Schmitt (born 1965), Olympic champion in fencing 1988, lives in Bornheim
Christian Knees (born 1981), cyclist, lives in Bornheim
Célia Šašić (born 1988), footballer, lives in Hersel

Honorary citizen
Heinrich Böll (1917–1985), lived from 1982 to 1985 in the district Merten and is buried there in the old cemetery. On the occasion of his 25th death, Böll was posthumously appointed honorary citizen.

References

External links

Populated places on the Rhine